La Nación is a Costa Rican newspaper. It is published in San José, Costa Rica. The newspaper is a general purpose newspaper, and circulates daily all year long, except on three Costa Rican holidays, Good Friday and the following Saturday, and the day after the New Year's Day.

History 
La Nación was founded on October 12, 1946, by Sergio Carballo Romero as director, Ricardo Castro Beeche as manager, and Jorge Salas heading the administration. The first reporters were Adrián Vega Aguiar, Salvador Lara, Eduardo Chavarría, Federico González Campos, Claudio Ortiz Oreamuno and Joaquín Vargas Gené. The newspaper was born during the confusion and political unrest caused by lingering electoral fraud, corruption scandals, government repression and street violence against the opposition, with the participation of the Costa Rican communist movement, that at the time was an ally to the Picado administration. Less than two year later after the foundation of La Nación, these events led into the 1948 Costa Rican Civil War.

La Nación today 
As of 2008 the newspaper is owned by Grupo Nación, which also owns several newspapers, such as Al Dia, El Financiero, and La Teja, and also the magazines Perfil, Sabores, SoHoand Su Casa. Grupo Nación also owns other related companies, such as Servigráficos, Impresión Comercial, and PAYCA. The group also owns several radio stations of the Grupo Latinoamericano de Radiodifusión, in alliance with the Spaniard Grupo Prisa, operating three radio stations: La Nueva 90.7, Los 40 Principales, and Bésame.   Overseas the Grupo Nación owns three important newspapers. The Panamanian weekly El Capital, and Siglo XXI and Al Día in Guatemala.

External links 
 Web site newspaper La Nación
 Web site sister newspaper Al Día

1946 establishments in Costa Rica
Maria Moors Cabot Prize winners
Newspapers published in Costa Rica
Publications established in 1946